Perigrapha i-cinctum is a moth of the family Noctuidae. It is found from southern and south-eastern Europe to Asia Minor.

The wingspan is 37–44 mm. Adults are on wing from March to April.

The larvae feed on the leaves of various plants, including Plantago, Rumex, Fragaria, Stellaria, Lamium, Centaurea, Pulsatilla  and Taraxacum species. Young larvae mine while older larvae feed within the rhizome, where pupation also takes place. Larvae can be found from May to June. The species overwinters as a pupa in the soil.

Subspecies
Perigrapha i-cinctum i-cinctum (in the Pannonian Basin)
Perigrapha i-cinctum gepida Hreblay, 1996 (France and Italy)
Perigrapha i-cinctum slovenica Michielie, 1966 (Slovenia and the Balkan Peninsula)
Perigrapha i-cinctum hethitica Hacker, 1993 (Turkey)

References

External links
 Lepiforum.de

Noctuidae
Moths described in 1775
Moths of Asia
Moths of Europe
Taxa named by Michael Denis
Taxa named by Ignaz Schiffermüller